Sang Run is an unincorporated community in Garrett County, Maryland, United States.

References

External links
Some notes on Sang Run, MD

Unincorporated communities in Garrett County, Maryland
Unincorporated communities in Maryland